This bibliography of Murray N. Rothbard contains a list of articles, books, book contributions, reviews, presentations and reports by American economist and historian Murray Rothbard as well as publications about him and his works.

Articles 
 "Not Worth a Continental." Faith and Freedom, vol. 1, no. 3 (Feb. 1950), pp. 9-10.
 In Spanish.
 "The Edict of Diocletian: A Case Study in Price Controls and Inflation." Faith and Freedom, vol. 1, no. 4 (Mar. 1950), p. 11.
 In Spanish.
 "Jefferson's Philosophy." Faith and Freedom, vol. 2, no. 7 (Mar. 1951).
 In Spanish.
 "The Root of Old Hickory." Faith and Freedom, vol. 2, no. 9 (May 1951), pp. 11-12.
 In Spanish.
 "Money, the State and Modern Mercantilism." Modern Age, vol. 7, no. 3 (Summer 1963), pp. 279-289.
 "The Frankfort Resolutions and the Panic of 1819." Register of the Kentucky Historical Society, vol. 61, no. 3 (Jul. 1963), pp. 214–19. .
 "Left and Right: The Prospects for Liberty." Left and Right: A Journal of Libertarian Thought, no. 1 (Spring 1965), pp. 4-22. Online with notes.
 Also published as "Left and Right: Selected Essays 1954–1965." Faith and Freedom, vol. V, no. 8 (Apr. 1954), and in Left and Right: A Journal of Libertarian Thought, no. 1 (Spring 1965). Part of the series The Right Wing Individualist Tradition in America, edited by Murray N. Rothbard and Jerome Tuccille. New York: Arno Press & The New York Times (1972), pp. 4–22.
 "Editorial." Journal of Libertarian Studies, vol. 1, no. 1 (1977), p. 1.
 "Society Without a State." Nomos, vol. 19 (1978), pp. 191–207. .
 The Individualist (Apr., Jul.–Aug. 1971); Revised and republished by the Center for Independent Education (1979). .
 "Soviet Foreign Policy: A Revisionist Perspective." Libertarian Review (Apr. 1978), pp. 23–27. Excerpt from For a New Liberty. Audio narration by Jeff Riggenbach.
 "Concepts of the Role of Intellectuals in Social Change Toward Laissez Faire." Journal of Libertarian Studies, vol. 9, no. 2 (Fall 1990), pp. 43-67. "An earlier version of this paper was delivered at a Conference on Economics and Social Change held by the London Academic and Cultural Resources Fund and The Institute for Sociology at the University of Warsaw, at Mmgowo, Poland, March 14-18, 1986."
 "His Only Crime Was Against the Old Guard: Milken." Los Angeles Times (Mar. 3, 1992).
 "Anti-Buchanania: A Mini-Encyclopedia." Rothbard-Lew Rockwell Report (May 1992), pp. 1–13.
 "Who Are the 'Terrorists'?" The Rothbard-Rockwell Report, vol. 4, no. 8 (Aug. 1993), pp. 1-9.
 "Nations by Consent: Decomposing the Nation-State." Journal of Libertarian Studies, vol. 11, no. 1 (Autumn 1994), pp. 1-10. An earlier version of this paper was delivered at the Regional Meeting of the Mont Pèlerin Society in Rio & laneiro, September, 1993.
 In Italian: Nazioni per consenso: decomporre lo Stato nazionale, with E. Renan, Nazione, cos’è, Facco, Treviglio (Bg) (1996), pp. 44-53.
 "Saint Hillary and the Religious Left." (Dec. 1994).
 "The Spooner-Tucker Doctrine: An Economist's View." Journal of Liberation Studies, vol. 20, no. 1 (Winter 2006), pp. 5-15.
 In Spanish.
 "The Other Side of the Coin: Free Banking in Chile." Austrian Economics Newsletter, vol. 10, no. 2.

Books

As author 
 Man, Economy, and State. New York: D. Van Nostrand (1962). Full text.
 Republished in Auburn, Ala.: Ludwig von Mises Institute (2004). 2nd ed. "Scholar's Edition." . Full text.
 The Panic of 1819: Reactions and Policies. New York: Columbia University Press (1962). Full text.
 Republished in Auburn, Ala.: Ludwig von Mises Institute (2004). .
 The Essential von Mises. Lansing, Mich.: Bramble Minibooks (1973).
 Republished in Auburn, Ala.: Ludwig von Mises Institute (2009). . Also in Chinese.
 America's Great Depression. D. Van Nostrand (1973). Full text.
 Republished in Auburn, Ala.: Ludwig von Mises Institute (2005). 5th Ed. .
 Power and Market: Government and the Economy. Kansas City: Sheed Andrews and McMeel (1970). Full text.
 Republished in Auburn, Ala.: Ludwig von Mises Institute (2004). .
 For a New Liberty: The Libertarian Manifesto. Collier Books (1973). Full text; audiobook. Auburn, Ala.: Ludwig von Mises Institute. .
 Egalitarianism as a Revolt Against Nature and Other Essays. Libertarian Review Press (1974). Full text.
 Republished in Auburn, Ala.: Ludwig von Mises Institute (2000). 2nd Ed. .
 Conceived in Liberty (4 vol.). New Rochelle, NY: Arlington House (1975–79). Full text.
 Republished in Auburn, Ala.: Ludwig von Mises Institute (2012). .
 The Logic of Action (2 vol.). Edward Elgar Publications (1997). . Full text.
 Reprinted as Economic Controversies. Auburn, Ala.: Ludwig von Mises Institute (2011).
 The Ethics of Liberty. Atlantic Highlands, NJ: Humanities Press (1982). 1st ed.
 Republished by New York University Press (1998), 2nd ed., with an introduction by Hans-Hermann Hoppe. Digitized by the Mises Institute. . Full text and audiobook.
 The Mystery of Banking. Richardson and Snyder, Dutton (1983). Full text.
 Republished in Auburn, Ala.: Ludwig von Mises Institute (2007). .
 The Case Against the Fed. Auburn, Ala.: Ludwig von Mises Institute (1994). Full text.
 Republished in Auburn, Ala.: Ludwig von Mises Institute (2007). .
 America's Great Depression [5th ed.]. Auburn, Ala.: Ludwig von Mises Institute (Jun. 15, 2000).
 An Austrian Perspective on the History of Economic Thought (2 vol.). Edward Elgar Publishers (1995). .
 Vol. 1: Economic Thought Before Adam Smith. Republished in Auburn, Ala.: Ludwig von Mises Institute (2009).
 Vol. 2: Classical Economics. Republished in Auburn, Ala.: Ludwig von Mises Institute (2009).
 Making Economic Sense. Auburn, Ala.: Ludwig von Mises Institute (2007). . Full text.
 The Betrayal of the American Right. Auburn, Ala.: Ludwig von Mises Institute (2007). . Full text and audiobook, narrated by Ian Temple.
 Despite posthumous publication in 2007, it appears in print virtually unchanged from the manuscript untouched since the 1970s.

As editor 
 Capital, Interest, and Rent, with an Introduction by Murray N. Rothbard. Kansas City: Sheed Andrews and McMeel (1897).
 A collection of journal articles and book reviews by Frank A. Fetter spanning the period of 1897 to 1937, covering the topics of capital, interest, and rent.

Contributions 
 "Harry Elmer Barnes as Revisionist of the Cold War." In: Harry Elmer Barnes, Learned Crusader: The New History in Action, by Arthur Goddard. Colorado Springs: R. Myles (1968). .
 Introduction to Capital, Interest, and Rent: Essays in the Theory of Distribution, by Frank A. Fetter, ed. by Murray Rothbard. Kansas City: Sheed Andrews and McMeel (1977). Full text.
 "Strategies for a Libertarian Victory." In: "A Special Section on Strategies for Achieving Liberty." Libertarian Review, vol. 7, no. 7 (Aug. 1978), pp. 18-24.
 Foreword to The Theory of Money and Credit, by Ludwig von Mises. Indianapolis: Liberty Fund (1981). Full text .
 "Toward a Theory of Strategy for Liberty" (Chapter 30). In: The Ethics of Liberty, with a new introduction by Hans-Hermann Hoppe. New York University Press (1998), pp. 257-73.

Correspondence
 "On the Significance of the Election" (Nov. 15, 1950). Private letter.

Interviews 
 "Interview: Murray Rothbard and Leonard Liggio Discuss Foreign Policy." Reason (Feb. 1973). Cover story.

Monographs 
 Spotlight on Keynesian Economics (private manuscript). Published online by the Mises Institute (2008).
 In Italian.
 Republished in Strictly Confidential. Auburn, Ala.: Mises Institute (2010), pp. 223-240.
 Toward a Strategy for Libertarian Social Change. (Apr. 1977).
 Wall Street, Banks, and American Foreign Policy. World Market Perspective (1984).
 In Spanish.
 Republished by the Center for Libertarian Studies (1995) and the Ludwig von Mises Institute (2005).

Book Reviews 
 Commentary on Rugged Individualism, by G.B. Cutten. Foundation for Economic Education (Nov. 16, 1948).
 In Italian: In Law, Nature and Reason, Rubbettino, Soveria Mannelli [Cz] (2005), pp.  63-75.
Republished in Rothbard vs the Philosophers. Auburn, Ala.: Ludwig von Mises Institute (2009).
 Review of A Mencken Chrestomathy, by H. L. Mencken. Analysis (Aug. 1949), p. 4.
 Review of The Road Ahead, by John T. Flynn. Analysis (Dec. 1949), p. 4.
 "Our Future." Review of Nineteen Eighty-Four, by George Orwell. Analysis (Sep. 1949), p. 4.
In Italian: "Il nostro futuro."

 Sources 
 Hart, David M., ed. "Works by Murray N. Rothbard on Strategy (1965-1992)." davidmhart.com.
 Vernaglione, Piero, ed. Rothbardian, a website containing a complete bibliography in English and Italian.
 "Murray N. Rothbard (1926-1995) Chronological Bibliography." Auburn, Ala.: Ludwig von Mises Institute.
 Galles, Gary M. (Mar. 2, 2018). "33 Choice Quotes from the Great Murray Rothbard: Celebrating the birthday of Mr. Libertarian." FEE Stories''. "Rothbard authored not only many books, but hundreds of articles on a range of topics from ethics, philosophy, and the history of ideas to history and economics."

External links 
 Works by Rothbard at Online Books Page
 Works by Rothbard at Online Library of Liberty

Rothbard, Murray
Rothbard, Murray
Rothbard, Murray
Rothbard, Murray